Johannes Arpe (29 July 1897 – 3 October 1962) was a German actor. He appeared in more than thirty films from 1953 to 1962.

Selected filmography

References

External links 

1897 births
1962 deaths
German male film actors
20th-century German male actors